Sonchus asper, the prickly sow-thistle, rough milk thistle, spiny sowthistle, sharp-fringed sow thistle, or spiny-leaved sow thistle, is a widespread flowering plant in the tribe Cichorieae within the family Asteraceae.

Description
Sonchus asper is an annual or biennial herb sometimes reaching a height of 200 cm.  with spiny leaves and yellow flowers resembling those of the dandelion. The leaves are bluish-green, simple, lanceolate, with wavy and sometimes lobed margins, covered in spines on both the margins and beneath. The base of the leaf surrounds the stem. The leaves and stems emit a milky sap when cut. One plant will produce several flat-topped arrays of flower heads, each head containing numerous yellow ray flowers but no disc flowers.

Distribution
Sonchus asper is native to Europe, North Africa, and western Asia. It has also become naturalized on other continents and is regarded as a noxious, invasive weed in many places. Its edible leaves make a palatable and nutritious leaf vegetable.

It is found in cultivated soil, pastures, roadsides, edges of yards, vacant lots, construction sites, waste areas and in grasslands.

References

External links
 Spiny Sowthistle in Virginia Tech Weed Identification Guide
 WeedAlert.com's article on the Spiny Sowthistle
photo of herbarium specimen at Missouri Botanical Garden, collected in Madagascar in 1932

asper
Flora of Europe
Flora of Western Asia
Flora of North Africa
Leaf vegetables
Cosmopolitan species
Flora of Syria